The Scottish devolution referendum of 1997 was a pre-legislative referendum held in Scotland on 11 September 1997 over whether there was support for the creation of a Scottish Parliament with devolved powers, and whether the Parliament should have tax-varying powers. The result was "Yes–Yes": a majority voted in favour of both proposals, and the Parliament was established following an election in 1999. Turnout for the referendum was 60.4%.

The referendum was a Labour Party manifesto commitment and was held in their first term in office after the 1997 UK general election, under the provisions of the Referendums (Scotland and Wales) Act 1997. It was the second referendum held in Scotland over the question of devolution, the first being in 1979, and is to date the only major referendum to be held in any part of the United Kingdom where voters were asked two questions in the same plebiscite.

Background

A referendum was held in 1979 under a Labour government which stipulated that a Scottish Assembly would come into being if the referendum had been supported by 50% of votes cast plus a controversial rule whereby at least 40% of the electorate had to vote in favour. Although 51.6% voted in favour, this was only 32.9% of the electorate so the Assembly was not brought into being. Shortly afterwards, the predominantly anti-devolution-led Conservative Party won the 1979 general election.

 
That government put devolution to one side but it was a policy area that remained on the agenda of the Labour Party. A Campaign for a Scottish Assembly was formed afterwards to continue the campaign. They brought together a committee of "prominent Scots" who drafted the document "A Claim of Right for Scotland". The "Claim" was published in 1988 and signed by most Scottish politicians, local councils, trade unions and churches. It was agreed to form a Scottish Constitutional Convention, made up of existing MPs and councillors.

The Labour Party included the establishment of a Scottish Parliament in its manifesto for the 1997 general election, which they won with a landslide majority of 179.

Referendum questions
The electorate was asked to vote on two sets of statements which corresponded to both proposals.

On the first ballot paper the following appeared:

On the second ballot paper the following appeared:

Campaign
Scottish Labour, the SNP, Scottish Liberal Democrats, and Scottish Greens campaigned for a "Yes" vote for both proposals whilst the Scottish Conservatives opposed both proposals. Labour MP, Tam Dalyell opposed the creation of the Parliament, but in favour of giving such a Parliament the power to raise and lower taxes on the basis that, although he opposed the Parliament as proposed by his party, if it did exist it should have tax-varying powers.

The official Yes campaign, Scotland Forward (styled "Scotland FORward"), was headed by the businessman Nigel Smith and came out of the groups that had previously formed the Scottish Constitutional Convention, along with the Scottish National Party. It was supported by the Labour, SNP, Liberal Democrat and Green parties.

The official No campaign, Think Twice, was headed by Brian Monteith, a former employee of the Conservative MP, Michael Forsyth. Board members included Donald Findlay, a QC, Rector of the University of St Andrews and vice-chairman of Rangers F.C., and senior Conservative peer, Lord Fraser. However, it struggled to get much business support as they were wary of opposing a project that had such support from the new government which had a large majority.

Campaigning in the referendum was suspended between the death and funeral of Diana, Princess of Wales. It was speculated that the Scottish referendum could have been postponed, but this would have required a recall of the UK Parliament and an amendment to the Referendums Act.

Opinion polling

Results
The result was "Yes-Yes": the majority voted "I agree" in favour of both proposals. Two council areas had an overall "Yes-No" result – Dumfries & Galloway and Orkney. More votes were cast for the first question than the second in all regions (except Fife), with substantially more spoilt ballots for the second question, perhaps due to voter confusion over the two papers.

Question 1

By council area

Question 2

By council area

Votes in favour of tax-varying powers still commanded significant majority, when compared to establishing the Parliament per se. A majority voted 'I agree' in every local council, apart from in Dumfries & Galloway and Orkney.

Overall turnout by council area

Outcome
In response to the majority voting for "Yes" to both proposals, the UK Parliament passed the Scotland Act 1998. This established a Scottish Parliament for the first time since the adjournment of the pre-Union Parliament of Scotland in 1707. The devolved Parliament convened for the first time in May 1999, following its first election. This was a poll that the Conservative Party had to fight despite losing their "No" Campaign and having no Westminster seats in Scotland after losing the 1997 general election. The Scotland Act 1998 also created the Scottish Executive, later to become known as the Scottish Government.

Reaction to the result

Professor Tom Devine, academic at the University of Edinburgh, dubbed the referendum result "the most significant development in Scottish political history since the Union of 1707". As well as the "Yes" campaign leader stated "it does, I hope, end much argument and dispute". Prime Minister Tony Blair claimed that "the era of big centralised government is over".

The "Yes" campaign leaders Donald Dewar (Scottish Labour Party) and Alex Salmond (Scottish National Party) held different views over the devolution proposal. However, they put their political differences aside immediately after the vote in celebration. Despite this, the SNP's calls for independence soon reignited with SNP leader Alex Salmond claiming that there would be an independent Scotland within his lifetime. The "No" campaign did not share this optimism and feared that this vote was a catalyst towards the break-up of the Union.

When the Secretary of State for Scotland, Donald Dewar, went back to London to implement the referendum result, he found the Whitehall civil service unwilling to give up powers and doubting that matters over and above those previously handled by the Scottish Office (such as education, health, transport, police and housing) should be politically devolved. Detail was also lacking in that the Scottish Constitutional Convention had failed to address issues such as the role of The Queen or aspects of tax-varying powers.

See also
Referendums in the United Kingdom
1997 Welsh devolution referendum
Scottish independence
Scottish Parliament
1979 Scottish devolution referendum
2014 Scottish independence referendum

References

Referendums in Scotland
Scottish devolution referendum
Devolution referendum
1990s elections in Scotland
Scottish devolution referendum
Scottish devolution
Constitution of the United Kingdom
Autonomy referendums
Scottish devolution referendum